Barankinya Gosta (1935–1998) was a prominent Zimbabwean Chewa sculptor.

A native of Mozambique, Barankinya Gosta was a resident of Zimbabwe's renowned Tengenenge Sculpture Community. He worked primarily in wood, which he painted; his style was derived from that used in traditional Chewa masks.

Barankinya Gosta's work is in the collection of the Chapungu Sculpture Park.

External links
Barankinya Gosta mentioned in article about the Tengenenge Sculpture Community
Biographical sketch of Barankinya Gosta (expected in March 2007)

1935 births
1998 deaths
Date of birth missing
Place of birth missing
Date of death missing
Place of death missing
20th-century Zimbabwean sculptors